SS John Oxley is a steamship that previously served as a pilot boat and lighthouse and buoy tender. The ship was built in Scotland in 1927 for the Queensland Government. The vessel was requisitioned by Royal Australian Navy during the World War II. Returned to her duties after the war, John Oxley remained active until 1968, when her deteriorating condition made her unusable. In 1970, the ship was donated by the Queensland Government to the Lady Hopetoun and Port Jackson Marine Steam Museum (now the Sydney Heritage Fleet) for preservation, but due to other projects, work was sidelined until 2004. The ship has undergone restoration for the past 20 years at Rozelle Bay on a floating dock. In April 2022, she was towed to dry dock at Garden Island, re-floated successfully and returned to Rozelle Bay for further restoration work afloat.

Design and construction
Bow, McLachlan and Company of Paisley in Renfrewshire, Scotland built John Oxley in 1927, under yard number 464. She was launched on 20 July 1927, and completed later that year. The vessel had a crew of 15, and in her role as a pilot boat, could carry 14 harbour pilots.

Service career

In early October 1927, John Oxley left Greenock, Scotland bound for Brisbane via the Red Sea and Indian Ocean. While en route in the Mediterranean Sea, she responded to a distress signal by the tugboat Jackstay and towed it to Malta. It arrived in Brisbane on 9 December 1927.

She was delivered to the Government of Queensland Harbours and Marine Department, whom she served as a pilot boat in Moreton Bay and buoy tender and lighthouse tender along the Queensland coast.

During World War II, John Oxley was requisitioned by the Royal Australian Navy and a 20mm Oerlikon anti-aircraft gun was mounted on the stern. She was returned to her former duties in 1946, and converted from coal to oil fuel that same year.

John Oxley continued to serve as a pilot tender, lighthouse and buoy tender until 1968 when she was decommissioned. In her later years she had become increasingly decrepit, such that in 1964 the Seamen's Union of Australia's journal called her a "rust heap" with "the worst living conditions of any ship on the entire Australian coast".

Preservation

John Oxley was donated to the Lady Hopetoun and Port Jackson Marine Steam Museum (now the Sydney Heritage Fleet), arriving in Sydney in August 1970 and initially moored at Birkenhead Point. She saw very little repair work until 1997, when restoration on another ship, the barque James Craig, was at a stage where she could be taken off the floating dock. Until then, her hull had gradually deteriorated and she was badly in need of repairs when put on the floating dock in place of the James Craig.

Since 2002 the John Oxley has been under continuous restoration at the shipyard of the Sydney Heritage Fleet in Rozelle Bay. During eighty years on the water, the ship had incurred substantial corrosion to the hull, decks and superstructure. The majority of the plates of the ship's riveted hull have required complete replication using the same hot riveted method as when the ship was built.

The restoration work also entails the repair and reconditioning of all machinery, masts and rigging, timber work, internal fitout and generally making the ship seaworthy. The ship will satisfy the survey requirements for safe operation and make coastal voyages.

Re-float
After 20 years of restoration work on the Sea Heritage Dock, John Oxley was re-floated in the Captain Cook Graving Dock at Garden Island on 2 April 2022, and officially re-launched in a ceremony at Glebe Island the following day. She returned to the Sydney Heritage Fleet base at Rozelle Bay on 14 April 2022 to be moored alongside Kanangra, which has taken her place on the Sea Heritage Dock. John Oxley will now undergo further work towards being fully commissioned, in a time-frame dependent on availability of funding and volunteer labour. It is hoped she'll be steaming the Australian coast once more by around 2036-2037

Gallery

References

Notes

Bibliography

External links

 Sydney Heritage Fleet
 John Oxley

Auxiliary ships of the Royal Australian Navy
Iron and steel steamships of Australia
Museum ships in Australia
Ships built on the River Clyde
1927 ships